Photostylus pycnopterus, the Starry smooth-head, is a species of slickhead found in all oceans at depths of from  to .  This species is the only known species in its genus.  This species grows to a length of  SL.

References
 

Alepocephalidae
Monotypic fish genera
Fish described in 1933
Taxa named by William Beebe